The Shade–Lohmann Bridge is a pair of twin cantilever bridges that carry Interstate 474 (I-474) and U.S. Route 24 (US 24) over the Illinois River near the Peoria Lock and Dam located at River Mile 158.0 in Tazewell County, in the U.S. state of Illinois. It connects Bartonville and Creve Coeur. Built in 1973, the bridge was named after Pekin's former mayor and Illinois legislator J. Norman Shade, and Martin B. Lohmann, who served in the Illinois Legislature continuously from 1923 to 1953. On March 26, 2017, it was announced that the bridge will undergo reconstruction for steel repairs, electrical work, removing the sediment from bridge piers, and painting the bridge. The project cost $13.5 million. Work started in April 2017 and was completed in November 2018.

References 

Bridges on the Interstate Highway System
Buildings and structures in Peoria, Illinois 
Bridges over the Illinois River
Bridges in Peoria County, Illinois 

Bridges in Tazewell County, Illinois
Bridges completed in 1975
Road bridges in Illinois
Interstate 74
Cantilever bridges in the United States